Chom Rat Chong Charoen (lit: Long live the great king) was the royal and national anthem of Rattanakosin Kingdom.

History 
In 1855, there were two captains, Thomas George Knox and Captain Impey. They both arrived in Rattanakosin and both brought the song "God Save the King", which is a song in honour of Queen Victoria of the United Kingdom to Siam. New lyrics were written in English in honour of the King Rama V, which has shown significant evidence in the Siam Recorder.

Later, Phraya Sisunthonwohan changed the lyrics in Siam dialect to the poetics of the poem, Quite by naming the new song "Chom Rat Chong Charoen".

Relinquishment
When King Rama V visited British Singapore in 1871, 'God Save the King' was played and it was realised that the song is both the national anthem of Britain and Siam. After he returned back to Siam, he invited  to discuss about changing the royal and national anthem. Khru Mi Khaek decided to bring "Bulan Loi Luean", a piece composed by a former King, Rama II and decided to add a part to the song.

Lyrics

See also
Sansoen Phra Narai, a former royal anthem of Thailand
Bulan Loi Luean, another former royal anthem of Thailand

References 

Thai songs
Historical national anthems
Royal anthems
National anthem compositions in G major
Songs about kings
God Save the King